is a Japanese former swimmer, who specialized in individual medley events. He is a two-time Olympian (2000 and 2004), a double Olympic finalist in both 200 and 400 m individual medley, and a silver medalist at the 2002 Asian Games in Busan, South Korea.

Miki made his first Japanese team, as a 17-year-old teen, at the 2000 Summer Olympics in Sydney. He failed to reach the top 8 final of the 200 m individual medley, finishing his semifinal run with a slowest time of 2:03.90.

At the 2002 Asian Games in Busan, South Korea, Miki touched out China's Ouyang Kunpeng to earn a silver medal in the men's 200 m individual medley (2:02.07), giving Japan its straight 1–2 finish.

Miki extended his swimming program at the 2004 Summer Olympics in Athens, competing in two medley events. He achieved FINA A-standards of 1:59.99 (200 m individual medley) and 4:14.79 (400 m individual medley) from the Olympic trials in Tokyo. On the first day of the Games, Miki placed seventh in the 400 m individual medley with a time of 4:19.97, edging out Australia's Travis Nederpelt by 0.11 seconds. Five days later, in the 200 m individual medley, Miki rounded out the top 8 final to last place in 2:02.16, five seconds behind winner, U.S. swimmer, and eventual Olympic record holder Michael Phelps.

References

External links
Profile – Japanese Olympic Committee 

1983 births
Living people
Japanese male medley swimmers
Olympic swimmers of Japan
Swimmers at the 2000 Summer Olympics
Swimmers at the 2004 Summer Olympics
People from Shiga Prefecture
Asian Games medalists in swimming
Swimmers at the 2002 Asian Games
Asian Games silver medalists for Japan
Medalists at the 2002 Asian Games
21st-century Japanese people